Chapra Assembly constituency (pronounced Chhapra) is an assembly constituency in Saran district in the Indian state of Bihar.  In 2015 Bihar Legislative Assembly election, Chapra was one of the 36 seats to have VVPAT enabled electronic voting machines.

Overview
Chhapra assembly seat has a unique distinction of electing either a Rajput or Yadav since 1967 belonging to various parties. The dominating caste, after delimitation is Vaishya which accounts for 65,000 of the 2.89 lakh voters. The vaishya community has 10-12% population in Chhapra.

As per Delimitation of Parliamentary and Assembly constituencies Order, 2008, No. 118 Chapra Assembly constituency is composed of the following: Chhapra municipality and Naini, Fakuli, Karinga, Sadha, Mouna, Tenua and Barhara Mahaji gram panchayats of Chapra community development block; Rivilganj CD Block.

Chapra Assembly constituency is part of No. 20 Saran (Lok Sabha constituency). It was earlier part of Chapra (Lok Sabha constituency). Chhapra assembly seat had a unique distinction of electing either a Rajput or Yadav since 1965 till 2014 belonging to various parties. Randhir Kumar Singh (RJD) won the by-poll from Chhapra in 2014. First time, a non-Yadav non-Rajput Dr. C. N. Gupta (BJP) won from assembly seat in 2015 Bihar Legislative Assembly election.

Members of Legislative Assembly

Election results

2020

2015

2014 by-election

References

External links
 

Assembly constituencies of Bihar
Politics of Saran district